Bangladesh Olympic Association (IOC code: BAN) is the National Olympic Committee representing Bangladesh. It is also the body responsible for Bangladesh's representation at the Commonwealth Games. Its president is the Bangladesh Army chief General SM Shafiuddin Ahmed. Bangladesh is the largest country by population that has not won a single medal in the olympics.

History
Bangladesh Olympic Association was established on 1979. Saidur Rahman Dawn in 1984 competed in the Los Angeles Olympics becoming the first Bangladeshi to participate in the olympics. It held its first annual general meeting in 2017. The General assembly was chaired by the president and 49 members of the assembly.

Affiliated national bodies
Bangladesh Archery Federation
Bangladesh Athletics Federation
 Bangladesh Badminton Federation
Bangladesh Basketball Federation
Bangladesh Boxing Federation
Bangladesh Cricket Board
Bangladesh Cycling Federation
Bangladesh Fencing Association
 Bangladesh Football Federation
 Bangladesh Golf Federation
Bangladesh Gymnastics Federation
 Bangladesh Handball Federation
 Bangladesh Hockey Federation
Bangladesh Judo Federation
Bangladesh Karate Federation
Bangladesh Rowing Federation
 Bangladesh Shooting Federation
Bangladesh Swimming Federation
Bangladesh Table Tennis Federation
Bangladesh Taekwondo Federation
Bangladesh Tennis Federation
Bangladesh Volleyball Federation
Bangladesh Weightlifting Federation
Bangladesh Wrestling Federation
Bangladesh Rugby Association
 Bangladesh Chess Federation
Bangladesh Kabaddi Federation
Bangladesh Wushu Federation

See also
Bangladesh at the Olympics
Bangladesh at the Commonwealth Games

References

Bangladesh
Bangladesh
Oly
Bangladesh at the Olympics
1979 establishments in Bangladesh
Sports organizations established in 1979